"I Can't Go on Without You" is a 1948 song by Bull Moose Jackson and His Buffalo Bearcats. The song was composed by Henry Glover and Sally Nix. The single was Jackson's most successful release on the US Billboard R&B chart, reaching number one for eight weeks.

See also
 List of Billboard number-one R&B singles of the 1940s

References

1948 songs
Bull Moose Jackson songs